Regular Joe may refer to:
 Regular Joe (album), an album by Joe Diffie
 Regular Joe (TV series), an American sitcom